Rissoina deshayesi is a species of minute sea snail, a marine gastropod mollusk or micromollusk in the family Rissoinidae.

Description
The height of the shell attains 5.5 mm

Distribution
This species occurs in the Indian Ocean off Réunion and the Aldabra Atol.

References

 Schwartz von Mohrenstern G. (1860-1864). über die familie der Rissoiden und insbesondere die gattung Rissoina. Denkschriften der Mathematisch-Naturwissenschaftlichen Classe der Kaiserlichen Akademie der Wissenschaften, Wien 19 [1860], pp. 71–188 + 11 pl.; [1864], pp. 56 + 4 pl.
 Taylor, J.D. (1973). Provisional list of the mollusca of Aldabra Atoll.

External links
 

Rissoinidae
Gastropods described in 1860